Ricky Wilson may refer to:

 Ricky Wilson (American musician) (1953–1985), guitarist of The B-52's
 Ricky Wilson (basketball) (born 1964), American basketball player
 Ricky Wilson (singer) (born 1978), English singer of Kaiser Chiefs

See also
 Richard Wilson (disambiguation)